The Social Democratic Party (SDP) is a centre-left political party in Taiwan founded in 2015. The SDP is one of Taiwan's "Third Force" parties, a collection of parties that do not self-claim to either the Pan-Green or Pan-Blue Coalitions and tend to be rooted in social movements. In 2015, the SDP formed a coalition with the Green Party Taiwan to contest the 2016 legislative election.

Political ideology 
The SDP is a social-democratic and progressive party, calling for a reduction in income inequality, the protection of labour rights, the abolition of the death penalty and the legalisation of same-sex marriage. The party has also called for a reform to Taiwan's electioneering process, criticising the advantage given to parties with big financial backers.

Electoral history 
In the 2016 legislative election, the SDP ran in a coalition with the Green Party Taiwan, garnering 2.5% of the vote and winning no seats.

In the 2018 local elections SDP candidate Miao Po-ya won a seat on the Taipei City Council. She is one of the first openly lesbian members of the municipal council.

Notes

References

2015 establishments in Taiwan
Political parties established in 2015
Political parties in Taiwan
Taiwanese nationalist political parties
Progressive parties in Taiwan
Social democratic parties in Taiwan